The Basilica Shrine of Our Lady of the Miraculous Medal, also known as Miraculous Medal Shrine, is at 500 E. Chelten Ave in the East Germantown neighborhood of Philadelphia, Pennsylvania. The church now known as the Basilica Shrine was founded by the Congregation of the Mission in 1879 as the Chapel of the Immaculate Conception on the grounds of St. Vincent's Seminary. In 1927, Fr. Joseph Skelly, CM, commissioned the creation of Mary's Central Shrine within the chapel to promote devotion to Our Lady of the Miraculous Medal, a title of the Virgin Mary originating with her apparitions to Saint Catherine Labouré in Paris in 1830.

On January 25, 2023, it was announced that the Vatican's Congregation for Divine Worship and the Discipline of the Sacraments issued a decree granting the Miraculous Medal Shrine (jointly the Chapel of the Immaculate Conception and Mary's Central Shrine within it), the title Minor Basilica. This made the Basilica Shrine the second basilica in the Archdiocese of Philadelphia along with the Cathedral Basilica of Saints Peter and Paul.

Founding 
In 1841, the Congregation of the Mission established St. Vincent's Seminary on the outskirts of the borough of Germantown, six miles north of Philadelphia. (Germantown would later become part of a geographically expanded Philadelphia in the Consolidation Act of 1854.) The Vincentians planned to build a chapel on the grounds of the seminary to serve Vincentian priests, brothers, and seminarians. Archbishop James Frederick Wood of the Archdiocese of Philadelphia requested that the plans be modified so that the chapel would also serve the working class immigrants in the area who did not have a parish church at the time. This chapel was opened to the public in 1879.

Creation of the Shrine 
In 1927, Fr. Joseph Skelly, CM, expanded the chapel to create a shrine to our Our Lady of the Miraculous Medal. The large sculpture of Carrara marble depicts the Blessed Mother extending her arms as she did in her second apparition to Saint Catherine Labouré on November 27, 1830.

Importance to the Immigrant Community 
The Vincentians have had a long history of serving the immigrant community in Philadelphia. They originally came to the city in 1841 at the request of Bishop Francis Kenrick, who asked them to administer and serve as faculty at the new seminary he founded, which is known today as St. Charles Borromeo Seminary. At the time, the Catholic population of the diocese was about 100,000 and growing rapidly, yet there were only 38 priests to serve them. In the ensuing years, the Vincentians traveled throughout the Philadelphia area and New Jersey serving as parish priests. In 1849, again at the request of Bishop Kenrick, they established St. Vincent de Paul Parish in Germantown to serve the growing number of Irish-Catholic immigrants in the area, many of whom had fled hunger and religious persecution in their home country. Later, the Vincentians would found local churches to serve Italian-American immigrants and African-Americans who came to the city in the Great Migration. In recent years, the Basilica Shrine has collaborated with various ethnic and cultural communities around Philadelphia to install devotional shrines in the lower chapel of the Basilica Shrine and on the grounds of the Basilica Shrine. Examples of these cultural shrines include 

 Our Lady of Guadalupe, in recognition of those with Latino heritage.
 Our Lady of Knock, in recognition of those with Irish heritage.
 Our Lady of FIAT, in recognition of those with Filipino heritage.
 Our Lady of La Leche, in recognition of those with Hispanic heritage as well as mothers who are expecting to give birth or nursing.

In addition, each year The Basilica Shrine, in collaboration with the St. Thomas Syro-Malabar Forane Catholic Church in the Northeast section of Philadelphia, hosts a Holy Mass in the Syro Malabar Rite and a rosary procession on the feast day of Our Lady of Vailankanni, a Marian title originating with apparitions of the Blessed Mother in India in the 16th and 17th centuries. A statue of Our Lady of Vailankanna is permanently displayed in the lower chapel and moved to the main church for feast day services.

The lower chapel also contains the Shrine of Our Lady of the Globe, a depiction of the Blessed Mother as she appeared in her third apparition to Saint Catherine later on November 27, 1830.

External links 

 Basilica Shrine's website

References 

Churches in the United States
Churches in Pennsylvania
Basilica churches
Basilica churches in the United States
Catholic churches in the United States